Michael Anthony Pegues (born May 11, 1962) is an African American visual artist living in New York City. Born and raised in Brooklyn, mother's family from Liberia, father's from Portugal, he attended alternative High School Redirection, Brownsville, Brooklyn, and later Nassau Community College, Garden City, LI.  Self-taught, modern-day Fauve, Expressionist as well as Pop artist, contemporary of Andy Warhol, Jean-Michel Basquiat, Keith Haring, his work is strongly influenced by Hip Hop and Graffiti. Pegues had his first major solo and retrospective show at the FB Gallery in New York in 2012, "Prince Michael's Neverland: The Measure of an Artist: Michael Anthony Pegues," May 16 – June 3. His work was exhibited in Italy, his first solo show abroad, in 2014 at Le 4 Pareti: galleria d'arte, Napoli, April 5–17.
His acrylic canvases, sculptures and assemblages have also been exhibited in New York at Aurora Gallery, Chelsea (under the graffiti tag Mazike), Jonathan Shorr Gallery, Soho, and the New York Public Library, among other places.

He has collaborated with the artist Cinthus (aka Martin H.Leff-Cinthus) and the writer Tom Mathew, illustrating the latter's children's book The Magic Rug: A Christmas Story (Staten Island, New York: Trademark Universal, Inc., 2010).

A prominent figure in the downtown art scene, he frequently attends gallery openings, receptions, fundraisers and other social functions, and has been photographed by the likes of nightlife photographer Patrick McMullan, Bill Farrell, Cojo "Art Juggernaut", and society photographer Annie Watt.

See also
 List of artists from Brooklyn

References

Other sources
 Tribeca Citizen, "Coming Up: Woodyfest, Juggling, Chely Wright," May 13, 2012, Arts & Culture, Events

Museum of Uncut Funk Press Release for FB Gallery Show

FB Gallery Closing Party

Francois B's Photostream: Michael Anthony Pegues, Tribeca, NYC 2012, Michael Anthony Pegues wearing the jacket he designed for his art exhibition at FB gallery (May 16 / June3), May 17, 2012

Michael Anthony Pegues alle 4 pareti a Napoli, Via Fiorelli 12/d, il 5 Aprile al 17 Aprile, 2014

Promo for Le 4 Pareti show

 My Small Story: Over 300 Filmed New York Stories, "The Measure of Michael Anthony Pegues,"  Unscripted Video Interview by LaRon Batchelor, May 16, 2012

Private Noise, "Michael Anthony Pegues listening to "Fool to Cry" by The Rolling Stones," by Sam Utne, July 26, 2011, 9AM

 Dana's Dailies "100 Years from Now: Michael Anthony Pegues," by Dana Roc, Feb  17, 2011, 8:22pm

@149st - The Cyber Bench: Documenting New York City Graffiti, Past Shows & Events, Aurora Gallery, 515 west 29th Street (10th-11th) presents "History in the Making Part III: Graffiti Got Game!," Featuring new basketball themed works of over twenty graffiti artists, Sept 9 - 30, 2005

TimeOut New York, "Public Eye: Michael A. Pegues, 43, Sixth Avenue and West 4th Street," by Time Out editors (Howard Halle), Thu. Mar 23, 2006

Winter Walk, Photograph of artist in Bryant Park  by Leanne Staples, "Queen of Manhattan Street Photography,"  December 16, 2013 

 New York Public Library, "Meet the Artist: Michael Pegues," by Sherri Liberman, Mulberry Branch, June 20, 2013

 Art Slant: Michael Anthony Pegues

Official Website of Michael Anthony Pegues

Living people
American conceptual artists
1962 births
People from Brooklyn
20th-century American painters
American male painters
American contemporary painters
Painters from New York City
American pop artists
Nassau Community College alumni
20th-century African-American painters
21st-century African-American people
20th-century American male artists